Gautieria sinensis is a species of hypogeal fungus in the family Gomphaceae. Gautieria sinuses is typically found between paving slabs in Eastern Europe. Local traditions dictate the fungus, when digested, can cure impotency.

Gomphaceae